George Clayton Kennedy (1919–1980) was a professor of geochemistry at UCLA and a botanist with an interest in orchids.

Names published 
(incomplete list)
 Coryanthes bergoldii G.C. Kenn. ex Dodson
 Lycaste mathiasiae G.C.Kenn.  Orchid Digest 42(2): 60. 1978 
 Myrmecophila brysiana (Lem.) G.C.Kenn. – Orchid Digest 43(6): 210. 1979 
 Myrmecophila exaltata (Kraenzl.) G.C.Kenn. – Orchid Digest 43(6): 211. 1979 
 Myrmecophila wendlandii (Rchb.f.) G.C.Kenn. – Orchid Digest 43(6): 211. 1979 
 Odontoglossum splendens (Rchb.f.) G.C.Kenn. & Garay – Orchid Digest 40(3): 98. 1976 
 Rossioglossum (Schltr.) Garay & G.C.Kenn. – Orchid Digest 40(4): 139. 1976 
 Rossioglossum grande (Lindl.) Garay & G.C.Kenn. – Orchid Digest 40(4): 142. 1976 
 Rossioglossum grande (Lindl.) Garay & G.C.Kenn. var. aureum (Stein) Garay & G.C.Kenn. – Orchid Digest 40: 142. 1976 
 Rossioglossum insleayi (Baker ex Lindl.) Garay & G.C.Kenn. – Orchid Digest 40(4): 142. 1976 
 Rossioglossum insleayi (Lindl.) Garay & G.C.Kenn. var. leopardinum (Regel) Garay & G.C.Kenn. 
 Rossioglossum powellii (Schltr.) Garay & G.C.Kenn. – Orchid Digest 40(4): 142. 1976 
 Rossioglossum schlieperianum (Rchb.f.) Garay & G.C.Kenn. – Orchid Digest 40(4): 143. 1976
 Rossioglossum schlieperianum (Rchb.f.) Garay & G.C.Kenn. var. flavidum (Rchb.f.) Garay & G.C.Kenn. – Orchid Digest 40(4): 143. 1976 (IK)
 Rossioglossum splendens (Rchb.f.) Garay & G.C.Kenn. – Orchid Digest 40: 142. 1976 (GCI)
 Rossioglossum splendens (Rchb.f.) Garay & G.C.Kenn. var. imschootianum (Rolfe) Garay & G.C.Kenn. – Orchid Digest 40(4): 143. 1976 (IK)
 Rossioglossum splendens var. imschootianum (Rolfe) Garay & G.C.Kenn. – Orchid Digest 40: 143. 1976 (GCI)
 Rossioglossum splendens (Rchb.f.) Garay & G.C.Kenn. var. leopardinum (Regel) Garay & G.C.Kenn. – Orchid Digest 40(4): 143. 1976 (IK)
 Rossioglossum splendens var. pantherinum (Rchb.f.) Garay & G.C.Kenn. – Orchid Digest 40: 143. 1976 (GCI)
 Rossioglossum williamsianum (Rchb.f.) Garay & G.C.Kenn. – Orchid Digest 40: 143. 1976 (GCI)

(These are not all accepted names.)

Publications 
(taken from Orchid Digest Index, incomplete)

"DispelaPulpul Him He Nothing – Something", 1977, Orchid Digest 41 (2)
"The Butterfly orchids: Section Glanduligera of the genus Oncidium", 1977, Orchid Digest 41 (4)
"Encyclia adenocaula and Encyclia kennedyi", 1981, Orchid Digest 45 (2)
"Further notes on the genus Anguloa: confused species of the Anguloa rucheri section", 1978, Orchid Digest 42 (4)
"The genera Schomburgkia and Myrmecophila", 1979, Orchid Digest 43 (6)
"The genus Anguloa", 1976, Orchid Digest 40 (4)
"The genus Clowesia", 1978, Orchid Digest 42 (3)
"The genus Comparettia", 1978, Orchid Digest 42 (5)
"The genus Dracula", 1979, Orchid Digest 43 (1)
"The genus Pabasatia", 1978, Orchid Digest 42 (4)
"The Laelias of Mexico", 1978, Orchid Digest 42 (1)
"Some members of the genus Coryanthes", 1978, Orchid Digest 42 (1)

References 

American botanists
University of California, Los Angeles faculty

1919 births
1980 deaths